José María Guerrero (born 7 April 1967) is an Ecuadorian former footballer. He played in eleven matches for the Ecuador national football team from 1987 to 1995. He was also part of Ecuador's squad for the 1991 Copa América tournament.

References

External links
 

1967 births
Living people
Ecuadorian footballers
Ecuador international footballers
Place of birth missing (living people)
Association football midfielders
C.D. El Nacional footballers
Barcelona S.C. footballers
C.D. ESPOLI footballers